John Gilfillan (29 September 1898 – 1976) was a Scottish-born footballer who played as a goalkeeper in the 1920s and 1930s, notably with Portsmouth.

He joined Heart of Midlothian from his local team Inverkeithing United, and played for Hearts in a 1922–23 Scottish Cup tie against Bo'ness. He was later loaned to East Fife, and played for them in the 1927 Scottish Cup Final against Celtic.

Gilfillan moved to play in England with Portsmouth of the Football League in December 1928. He was to go on to make 359 senior appearances with the south coast club, including playing for them in the FA Cup Finals of 1929 and 1934. In his nine seasons with the club he kept 107 clean sheets in 330 League matches.

In April 2009, he was included in a Times list of the Top 50 Portsmouth players of all time, and was described as being "one of the finest keepers in the club’s history with excellent positioning and agility the key to his success."

References 

1898 births
1976 deaths
Footballers from Fife
Association football goalkeepers
Scottish Football League players
English Football League players
Heart of Midlothian F.C. players
Ayr United F.C. players
East Stirlingshire F.C. players
East Fife F.C. players
Portsmouth F.C. players
Queens Park Rangers F.C. players
Inverkeithing United F.C. players
Scottish footballers
FA Cup Final players